Catholicos George II of Garni, Kevork II in Armenian, was the Catholicos of the Armenian Apostolic Church between 877 and 897. Hovhannes Draskhanakerttsi calls him an honorable man who was selected from the Catholicos's household by Prince Ashot I of Armenia to succeed Patriarch Zacharias. George anointed and crowned Ashot I when he was declared King of Armenia in 884. Upon King Ashot's death, George went to Bagaran to preside over his funeral. Ashot's heir Smbat I, who had been away at war, missed his father's funeral and was very grieved. Catholicos George went to comfort King Smbat at Yerazgavors, where he would later also preside at his coronation. This enraged the sparapet Abas who is said to have spread false rumors about the Catholicos in an attempt to bring him down. Abas tried to convince a holy man named Mashdotz from Sevanavank to join his conspiracy against the Catholicos and said he would name him Catholicos if it was successful. Mashdotz wrote a long letter in response, rejecting the offer to rebel against the Catholicos and chided Abas for his attempt. Hovhannes Draskhanakerttsi reports at this point Abas was struck by an illness and died, as if by divine wrath, and the other conspirators repented to the Catholicos out of fear. Around this time Dvin was hit by an earthquake, as it had been during Patriarch Zacharias's time, but this time it destroyed the church of the Catholicosate, as well as many other buildings and people.
Afshin, the Caliph's representative in Atropatene, who had made an agreement of friendship with Smbat, was worried at various victories Smbat was having and that he might not remain faithful to their agreement if he became too strong. Afshin invaded Armenia and reached Dvin. War broke out and Catholicos George went to meet Afshin in an attempt to get him to reconsider. Afshin attempted to get George to bring King Smbat to him for a discussion, but the nakharars advised him not to go for fear of a trap. They also begged the Catholicos not to return to Afshin but George insisted. Afshin saw that the Catholicos could not bring the King to him so he had George bound with iron fetters and handcuffs. Afshin marched against King Smbat and they met in battle, after which they agreed that Smbat would pay royal taxes to Afshin and reconfirm his oath. Afshin did not return the Catholicos however, who remained bound and suffered greatly. After two months of torture and prayers a ransom was demanded for the Catholicos's release. His bishops, including Hovhannes Draskhanakerttsi, approached the nakhararas and the ransom was gathered. George had been brought to Paytakaran where the ransom was paid and he was returned to Armenia.
Catholicos George died in Vaspurakan in 897 and his body was taken to the cemetery of Joroy Vank in Tosp. The king of his associates then elected Mashdotz to succeed him, the same Mashdotz who had previously rejected the chance to overthrow his predecessor.

Catholicoi of Armenia
Catholicos George II
Year of birth unknown
9th-century Armenian people
9th-century Oriental Orthodox archbishops